Nina Grønnum (born March 1st, 1945 in Copenhagen) is a Danish retired phonetician and associate professor emeritus from the University of Copenhagen. She is best known for her work on the pronunciation of Danish and especially her many studies on Danish intonation and prosody. She went by her married name Nina Thorsen or Nina Grønnum Thorsen until the 1980s.

She is included in Krak's Blue Book and the Royal Danish Academy of Sciences and Letters since 2003, and has been a fellow of The Society of Sciences in Lund member of the Council of the International Phonetic Association and vice institute leader of Institute of Nordic Studies and Linguistics at the University of Copenhagen.

She has been on the editorial boards of Acta Linguistica Hafniensia,  the Journal of the International Phonetic Association and Nordic Journal of Linguistics.

Biography
In 1972, she majored in phonetics from the University of Copenhagen and was assistant professor there from 1972-76 and then associate professor (from 1993 with special qualifications) until 2008 where she retired. She received the equivalent of a PhD in 1981, and the dr.phil degree in 1992 on the basis of her Groundworks of Danish intonation

Selected publications

Books

Papers

References

External links
 Nina Grønnum – University of Copenhagen
 Nina Grønnum - Personal website

Living people
Linguists from Denmark
University of Copenhagen alumni
1945 births
Women linguists
Linguists of Danish
Members of the Royal Danish Academy of Sciences and Letters
Phoneticians